The Maritime Analysis and Operations Centre (MAOC (N)) (or Maritime Analysis and Operations Centre – Narcotics), based in Lisbon, is an initiative by 6 EU Member Countries (France, Ireland, Italy, Spain, Netherlands, Portugal) and the UK and is co-funded by the Internal Security Fund of the European Union.

On the 30th of September 2007, Ministers from France, Ireland, Italy, the Netherlands, Portugal, Spain and the United Kingdom gathered in Lisbon, Portugal to not only acknowledge the threat posed by bulk movements of cocaine across the Atlantic to Europe and the movement of cannabis across the Mediterranean, but to join forces under a concrete initiative to counter the threat. The Agreement that established MAOC (N) states that the centre is to provide a forum for multi-lateral cooperation to suppress illicit drug trafficking by sea and air. The centre aims to use intelligence on drug smuggling operations, by air or sea, to apply the most suitable military and/or law enforcement teams to respond to situations that arise.

The signing of a treaty created the MAOC (N), establishing a one-of-a-kind centre in Europe that would develop into a trusted international platform for combatting international drug trafficking.

MAOC (N) is a European Law Enforcement unit with military support that coordinates maritime and aviation intelligence, resources, and trained personnel to respond to the threat posed by illicit drug trafficking by maritime and air conveyances.

Organisational structure
The MAOC (N) is staffed by Country Liaison Officers representing the police, customs, military and maritime authorities of the participating European nations, as well as by permanent liaison officers from the United States of the Drug Enforcement Administration, Lisbon Country Office, and the Joint Interagency Task Force South. There is a close collaboration with EUROPOL, the United Nations Office on Drugs and Crime (UNODC), the European Monitoring Centre for Drugs and Drug Addiction (EMCDDA), the European External Action Service (EEAS), the European Maritime Safety Agency (EMSA), EUROJUST and FRONTEX and other institutes, as well as countries like Canada, Cape Verde, Germany, Greece, and Morocco. MAOC (N) is headed by an executive director and guided by an executive board. The UK is represented by a country liaison officer and an office coordinator from the NCA. Ireland's representation is a combined one from the Irish Drugs Joint Task Force of the Garda Síochána (Irish police), the Revenue Commissioners.

The MAOC (N) concept allows for sharing intelligence, supported by air and surface assets from all the partners. This fusion creates an operational platform that is flexible, dynamic and effective. The Centre's success is built on the physical co-location of Country Liaison Officers from police agencies, customs authorities, and military attachés working together with a highly specialised team of analysts.

In addition to the commitment of MAOC (N)’s partner countries, bolstered by a stable funding stream from the European Union, the Centre’s success is greatly amplified through concerted efforts to build relationships around the world. MAOC (N)’s effective upstream engagement tackles trafficking organisations when the drugs are in bulk and of the highest purity before reaching the European market. MAOC (N) has proactively sought to establish and develop partnerships with a variety of European countries, including Belgium, Germany and Greece, while also reaching out to many countries around the globe, such as Argentina, Australia, Brazil, Canada, Cape Verde, Colombia, New Zealand and Senegal.

The costs of the MAOC (N) are shared between the participating states (aggregate 30% of total) and an EC Action Grant which covers the remaining 70% (€661,000). In 2007–2008, each state contributed an initial €35,000 followed a year later by a further €5,800 (approx) to cover a shortfall.

Operations
MAOC (N)’s work prevents significant quantities of illicit drugs from entering its partner countries’ markets and the wider European continent. However, this impact does not stop at the borders of the European Union.

About twenty operations were executed in MAOC (N)'s first six months, resulting in 10 seizures totalling more than 10 tonnes of cocaine. In an operation in June, 2007, 840 kilograms of cocaine were seized aboard a Brazilian flagged vessel which was intercepted by the French Navy, acting on UK intelligence. The vessel, drugs and prisoners were returned to Brazil for prosecution.

On 3 September 2010 British police acting on intelligence from the French Central Office against Illegal Narcotics Trafficking (OCRTIS) and supported by the Royal Navy's HMS Gloucester recovered around 30 kilos of cocaine which had been concealed inside the rudder of the yacht ‘Tortuga’.

The Irish Joint Task Force on Drug Interdiction co-operated with MAOC (N) and SOCA in Operation Sea Bight which intercepted a large consignment of cocaine off the Irish coast.
In its first 4 years of operations MAOC (N) supported the seizure of over 50 tonnes of cocaine and over 40 tonnes of cannabis.

MAOC (N)’s engagement and collaboration seek opportunities to take an active role in identifying, disrupting and dismantling the command and control structures of the higher echelons of transnational organised crime. These structures are responsible for crimes across multiple continents, and, with this in mind, the international cooperation spearheaded by MAOC (N) is vital.

The Centre offers tangible evidence of what can be achieved when collective, altruistic efforts are made towards shared objectives. This unique fusion platform demonstrates the crucial role of civil and military partnerships when working together to tackle security issues across the wider maritime domain.

Until June 2022, MAOC (N) has coordinated or supported almost 300 interventions, resulting in the seizure of over 259 tons of cocaine and 649 tons of cannabis. Over 1500 primary arrests from 87 different nationalities have been made, following interdictions representing a total of over €23.7 billion in assets denied to organized crime.

References

Illegal drug trade in Europe
Law enforcement in Europe
International law enforcement organizations
Organisations based in Lisbon